Mamakiki is a 2020 Indian Tamil-language romantic comedy film starring Preetha Anandan, Ramesh Thilak, Maanas Chavali and Dev. The film released on Zee5 after being delayed for several years.

Synopsis 
Four college friends (Madhu, Mani, Kiranthi, and Kishore) meet again after a sabbatical of five years.

Cast 

Preetha Anandan as Madhu
Ramesh Thilak as Mani
Maanas Chavali as Kiranthi 
Dev as Kishore
Madhuvanti Arun as Madhu's mother
Nalan Kumarasamy as a Director 
Swaminath R
Cheenu Mohan as Kranthi's father 
Jayaditya Kang as young Kishore
Sarath Tejas
Amrutha Srinivasan as Rita Miss
Kishore Rajkumar as a prospective groom for Madhu

Release 
The New Indian Express gave the film a rating of two out of five and wrote that "Overall, though weighed down by its flaws, Mamakiki is a middling feel-good comedy that makes us smile, if not laugh". A review from Zee5 called the film a "middling feel-good comedy". Digital media company LetsOTT mentioned that the film had some "funny" sequences but also "stretched out writing and average performances".

References

External links

2020 romantic comedy films
2020s Tamil-language films
2020 films
ZEE5 original films
2020 direct-to-video films
Indian romantic comedy films
Films scored by Jakes Bejoy
Films scored by Vishal Chandrasekhar